Dmytro Brovkin (born 11 May 1984) is a professional Ukrainian football striker who plays for FC Desna Chernihiv in the Ukrainian Second League. His first goal for MFC Mykolaiv was scored on 21 August 2011 against FC Lviv.

Honours
Desna Chernihiv
 Ukrainian Second League: 2012–13

External links
 Official Website Profile
 allplayers.in.ua

1984 births
Living people
People from Bakhchysarai Raion
Ukrainian footballers
Ukrainian footballers banned from domestic competitions
Ukrainian expatriate footballers
Expatriate footballers in Finland
Ukrainian expatriate sportspeople in Finland
Expatriate footballers in Poland
Ukrainian expatriate sportspeople in Poland
FC Dynamo-3 Kyiv players
FC Dynamo-2 Kyiv players
FC Obolon-Brovar Kyiv players
FC Vorskla Poltava players
FC Metalist Kharkiv players
AC Oulu players
FC Zorya Luhansk players
FC Prykarpattia Ivano-Frankivsk (2004) players
MFC Mykolaiv players
FC Arsenal-Kyivshchyna Bila Tserkva players
FC UkrAhroKom Holovkivka players
FC Desna Chernihiv players
Veikkausliiga players
Crimean Premier League players
FC Bakhchisaray players
FC Rubin Yalta players
Ukrainian First League players
Association football forwards